Dolichoderus sibiricus is a species of ant in the genus Dolichoderus. Described by Emery in 1889, the species is endemic to China, North Korea, Japan, Mongolia, South Korea and Russian Federation.

References

Dolichoderus
Hymenoptera of Asia
Hymenoptera of Europe
Insects described in 1889